Serge Teyssot-Gay (born 16 May 1963, in Saint-Étienne, Loire) is a French musician, he has been the guitarist of rock group Noir Désir until 29 November 2010. He met the other members of the band at their school in Bordeaux (Lycée Saint-Genès) during the 1980s. Aside from Noir Désir, his other musical endeavours include :
 the trio "Zone Libre", which became a quintet for 6 albums and tours.
 the guitar-oud duo with Khaled AlJaramani known as Interzone. 
 works with writers : music and literature
 He has also released two solo albums "Silence Radio" (1996) and "On croit qu'on en est sorti" (2000)

At the beginning of his music career, Serge favoured the use of the Gibson Les Paul guitar. However, since the release of Noir Désir's 1996 album 666.667 Club, a custom Fender Stratocaster closely resembling the Lite Ash model has become his most frequently used guitar. His brand new one is a Meloduende model "Black Sword".

Discography

With Noir Désir

Solo
 1996 : Silence Radio
 2000 : On croit qu'on en est sorti

With Interzone
 2005 : Interzone
 2007 : Deuxième Jour
 2013 : Waiting For Spring
 2019 : Kan Ya Ma Kan

With Zone Libre
 2007 : Faites vibrer la chair
 2009 : L'Angle Mort ( with Casey & Hamé )
 2011 : Les Contes du Chaos ( with Casey and B.James)
 2015 : Zone Libre PolyUrbaine ( with Mike Ladd and Marc Nammour)
 2017 : Debout dans les cordages (with Marc Nammour)
 2017 :  Kit de Survie (en milieu hostile) (with Akosh.s, Médéric Collignon, Mike Ladd and Marc Nammour)

With Joëlle Léandre
 2012 : TRANS
 2015 : TRANS 2

With Kintsugi 
 2017 : Yoshitsune , with Kakushin Nishihara et Gaspar Claus (Intervalle Triton/Les disques du Festival Permanent/ L’Autre Distribution )

With  Xie Yugang 谢玉岗  
 2018 : A Nano World 一幀世紀

CD-Books 
 2002 : Contre  with Lydie Salvayre
 2006 : Dis pas ça  with Lydie Salvayre
 2007 : Des millions de morts se battent entre eux  with Krzysztof Styczynski
 2008 : Attila József, à cœur pur  with Denis Lavant
 2016 : Ripostes, with Michel Bulteau, Krzysztof Styczynski and Saul Williams

Collaborations

 1993 : Hunger of a Thin Man by Théo Hakola
 1997 : Blues Stories by Little Bob
 1998 : 1000 Vietnam by Giorgio Canali
 2000 : Faux-ami by Marc Sens
 2001 : Who defecates in your head Bob? by Quincannon
 2002 : Contre with Lydie Salvayre
 2004 : Paris nous nourrit, Paris nous affame on the album "Regain de Tension" by the rap group La Rumeur
 2006 : Dis pas ça with Lydie Salvayre
 2007 : Je suis une bande ethnique à moi tout seul on the album "Du Cœur à l'Outrage" also by La Rumeur
 2007 : Des millions de morts se battent entre eux by Krzysztof Styczynski
 2007 : Je cherche (recorded in 2004) on the album "1997-2007 Les Inédits" by La Rumeur

Notes

External links
 

1963 births
Living people
Musicians from Saint-Étienne
French rock guitarists
French male guitarists